Biantidae is a family of the harvestman infraorder Grassatores with about 130 described species.

Description
Biantidae are between 1.5 and 5.5 millimeters long, with legs ranging from three to 25 mm and enlarged, armed pedipalps. Many species are mahogany, many others yellow with dark mottling.

Distribution
Biantidae have radiated greatly on the Indian subcontinent and Madagascar (which was once connected to India), with many other species from mainland Africa. One subfamily however, the Stenostygninae, is found on the West Indies, with one described species from mainland northern South America.

Relationships
Biantidae are included in the superfamily Samooidea, which mainly radiated in South America.

Name
The type genus is named after Biantes, the son of Parthenopaeus, one of the Epigoni who marched against Thebes in Greek mythology.

Genera

For a list of all described species, see the List of Biantidae species.

Biantinae
 Anaceros Lawrence, 1959 — Madagascar (4 species)
 Biantella Roewer, 1927 — Cameroon (1 species)
 Biantes Simon, 1885 — Nepal, India, Burma, Sumatra, Seychelles (30 species)
 Biantessus Roewer, 1949 — South Africa (2 species)
 Biantomma Roewer, 1942 — Bioko (1 species)
 Clinobiantes Roewer, 1927 — Cameroon (1 species)
 Cryptobiantes Kauri, 1962 (1 species)
 Eubiantes Roewer, 1915 — eastern Africa (1 species)
 Fageibiantes Roewer, 1949 — Madagascar (2 species)
 Hinzuanius Karsch, 1880 — Madagascar, Socotra, Comoros, Ethiopia (14 species)
 Ivobiantes Lawrence, 1965 (1 species)
 Metabiantes Roewer, 1915 — Africa (41 species)
 Monobiantes Lawrence, 1962 (1 species)
 Probiantes Roewer, 1927 — India (1 species)

Lacurbsinae
 Eulacurbs Roewer, 1949 — Ghana (1 species)
 Heterolacurbs Roewer, 1912 — Togo (1 species)
 Lacurbs Sørensen, 1896 — Cameroon, Ivory Coast (2 species)
 Metalacurbs Roewer, 1914 — western Africa (4 species)
 Prolacurbs Roewer, 1949 — Ghana (1 species)

Stenostyginae
 Bidoma Silhavy, 1973 — Haiti (1 species)
 Caribbiantes Silhavy, 1973 — Cuba (1 species)
 Decuella Avram, 1977 — Cuba (1 species)
 Galibrotus Silhavy, 1973 — Cuba (3 species)
 Manahunca Silhavy, 1973 — Cuba (3 species)
 Martibianta Silhavy, 1973 — Virgin Islands (1 species)
 Negreaella Avram, 1977 — Cuba (5 species)
 Stenostygnus Simon, 1879 — northern South America (1 species)
 Vestitecola Silhavy, 1973 — Haiti (1 species)

Zairebiantinae
 Zairebiantes H. Kauri, 1985 — Zaire (1 species)

Footnotes

References
 's Biology Catalog: Biantidae
  (eds.) (2007): Harvestmen - The Biology of Opiliones. Harvard University Press 

Harvestman families